Gorazd is a given name. It is a Slavic version of the Hebrew given name Gilad which means Hill Of Testimony, Monument. 

Notable people with the given name include:

Gorazd Hiti (born 1948), Slovene ice hockey player
Gorazd Kocijančič (born 1964), Slovene philosopher, poet and translator
Gorazd Škof (born 1977), Slovene handball player
Gorazd Sotler (1930–1987), Slovene sculptor
Gorazd Štangelj (born 1973), Slovene road bicycle racer
Gorazd Per (born 1997), Slovene road bicycle racer
Gorazd Zajc (born 1987), Slovene footballer

See also
Gorazd (Pavlík)

Slovene masculine given names